Abdul Jab(b)ar Taqwa (born 20 February 1949, in Kabul) served as governor of Parwan Province. 

He was educated in Afghanistan before attending University of Peshawar in Peshawar, Pakistan.

Taqwa was appointed as the governor of Takhar Province on March 16, 2010. He was wounded in the suicide bombing on May 28, 2011, that killed Mohammed Daud Daud.

He belongs to Tajik people.

References

External links
 http://www.defenselink.mil/News/newsarticle.aspx?id=51067

1954 births
Living people
Governors of Takhar Province
Governors of Parwan Province
Afghan Tajik people
Afghan expatriates in Pakistan
University of Peshawar alumni